Śrāddha (or Shradda) is any act that is performed with all sincerity and absolute faith in it. In the Hindu religion, it is the ritual that one performs to pay homage to one's 'ancestors' (Sanskrit: Pitṛs), especially to one's dead parents. Conceptually, it is a way for people to express heartfelt gratitude and thanks towards their parents and ancestors, for having helped them to be what they are and praying for their peace. It also can be thought of as a "day of remembrance". It is performed for both the father and mother separately, on their respective 'thithi' – death anniversaries  as per the Hindu Calendar. In addition it is performed for the entire community of 'pitr' – both from paternal and maternal side – collectively during the Pitru Paksha or Shraaddha paksha (Fortnight of ancestors), right before Sharad Navaratri in autumn.

Etymology 
'Śrāddha' means 'confidence, devotion', stemming from Proto-Indo-Iranian *ćraddʰaH- ('believe, have trust in'), ultimately from the Proto-Indo-European compound *ḱred-dʰeh₁- ('to put one's heart into somebody' > 'to believe'). It is cognate with the Latin crēdo ('to entrust, give credence'), the Old Avestan zrazdā- ('devoted, trusting, believing'), or the Old Irish creitid ('believe').

Rituals

In practice, the karta (person who performs the Śrāddha) (1) invites Brahmanas (priests) that day, invokes in them the divinity of his/her parent, worships and feeds them (2) performs a homa (fire ritual), appeasing Agni and Soma – the deities who transmit the offerings to the ancestors, nourish and protect them and (3) offers balls of rice to the departed souls ("pinda pradaana", offered to the Pitṛs, the ancestral spirits).The offerings are made to three generations i.e. father, grandfather and great-grandfather  / mother, fathers’mother, fathers’ grandmother.
The karta extends hospitality to the priest and concludes the ceremony by giving "dakshina" (fees) to the brahmanaas. (There are various other actions done to show respect to the Brahmanaas, like washing their feet etc. during the course of shraaddha). Crows are also revered in Hinduism and during Śrāddha the practice of offering food or pinda to crows is still in vogue.

Since this is one of the more important and noble "" (rituals meant to cleanse the mind and soul) that the Hindu sages have envisaged, it is imperative that the performer of the ritual understands what he or she is doing. Only then will the true intent of the ritual be fulfilled and the performer of the ritual feel completely gratified. Else, the ritual becomes just a mechanical exercise for one's part.

After death, the family performs the final rituals and holam. These rites are a reflection of a person’s life. They may also include Santhi-homam and Agni-homam. After the Santhi-homam, the body is sprinkled with Holy Water to cleanse it. Other rituals include offering food and applying herbs to the body. The Havan is performed in order to appease the God of Fire, Agni. During the homam, verses are recited while the performer asks the god to forgive the deceased’s mistakes and sins.

The Śrāddha period 
The scripture mandate performing 96 Śrāddha karmas. However, these practices are difficult to be adhered to.
In addition, once in year offerings are to a larger universe of forefathers –  during the pitr paksha.
In Hindu amanta calendar ( ending with amavasya ), second half of the month Bhadrapada is called Pitru Paksha: Pitṛpakṣa or Śrāddha pakṣa and its amavasya ( new moon ) is called sarvapitri amavasya. This part is considered inauspicious in muhurtaśāstra (electional astrology). At this time (generally September) crops in India and Nepal are ready and the produce is offered as a mark of respect and gratitude (by way of pinda) first to the ancestors be they parents or forefathers before other festivals like Navaratri begin.

Many people visit Hindu pilgrimage sites to perform, Śrāddha ceremonies, like Pehowa, Kurukshetra, Haridwar, Gokarna, Nashik, Gaya etc. Haridwar is also known for its Hindu genealogy registers.

See also 

 Antyesti
 Brahmin
 Hindu genealogy registers at Chintpurni, Himachal Pradesh
 Hindu genealogy registers at Haridwar
 Hindu genealogy registers at Jawalamukhi, Himachal Pradesh
 Hindu genealogy registers at Kurukshetra, Haryana
 Hindu genealogy registers at Peohwa, Haryana
 Hindu genealogy registers at Trimbakeshwar, Maharashtra
 Hindu genealogy registers at Varanasi
 Pitrs
 Sandhyavandhanam
 Vedic priesthood
 Śrāddha (Buddhadharma)

References

Further reading 
 Shraaddha, R. K. Srikanta Kumaraswamy, IIT, Chennai. In the Kannada language
 ಆಶ್ವಲಾಯನ ಪಾರ್ವಣ ಶ್ರಾದ್ಧ ಚಂದ್ರಿಕಾ (Kannada language) by mundodu narayana bhatta, hayagreeva nagara, udupi 576 102
 Shraaddha Chandrika (english) by mundodu narayana bhat, viraja, hayagreeva nagara udupi 576 102 

Hindu rituals related to death